Tognini is an Italian surname. Notable people with the surname include:

Franco Tognini (1907–1980), Italian gymnast
Michel Tognini (born 1949), French test pilot

See also

Gina Tognoni
Luigi Antognini

Italian-language surnames